Golman may refer to:

 Golman, Bangladesh, a village
 Golman Pierre (born 1971), Haitian former footballer
 Ab Golman, Hormozgan, Iran, a village